Bois Brule Creek may refer to:

Bois Brule Creek (Cinque Hommes Creek), a stream in Missouri
Bois Brule Creek (Osage River), a stream in Missouri